In enzymology, lovastatin nonaketide synthase is an enzyme that catalyzes the chemical reaction

acetyl-CoA + 8 malonyl-CoA + 11 NADPH + 10 H+ + S-adenosyl-L-methionine  dihydromonacolin L + 9 CoA + 8 CO2 + 11 NADP+ + S-adenosyl-L-homocysteine + 6 H2O

The 5 substrates of this enzyme are acetyl-CoA, malonyl-CoA, NADPH, H+, and S-adenosyl-L-methionine, whereas its 6 products are dihydromonacolin L, CoA, CO2, NADP+, S-adenosyl-L-homocysteine, and H2O.

This enzyme belongs to the family of transferases, specifically those acyltransferases transferring groups other than aminoacyl groups.  The systematic name of this enzyme class is acyl-CoA:malonyl-CoA C-acyltransferase (decarboxylating, oxoacyl- and enoyl-reducing, thioester-hydrolysing).

References

 

EC 2.3.1
NADPH-dependent enzymes
Enzymes of unknown structure